Conall mac Fidhghal, 24th King of Uí Maine, died 782.

Reign

Connall's era is very obscure. Following two relatively lengthy reigns under Aedh Ailghin (died 767) and Dunchadh ua Daimhine (died 780), his kingship marked the start of some four or five short reigns.

This may indicate conflict, perhaps due to internal succession disputes or aggression from the expanding Uí Briúin under Artgal mac Cathail (died 791).

Notes

References

 Annals of Ulster at CELT: Corpus of Electronic Texts at University College Cork
 Annals of Tigernach at CELT: Corpus of Electronic Texts at University College Cork
Revised edition of McCarthy's synchronisms at Trinity College Dublin.
 Byrne, Francis John (2001), Irish Kings and High-Kings, Dublin: Four Courts Press,

External links
 Commentary by Dan M. Wiley (The Cycles of the Kings Web Project)

People from County Galway
People from County Roscommon
8th-century Irish monarchs
Kings of Uí Maine